Schefflera euthytricha is a species of plant in the family Araliaceae. It is endemic to Fiji.

References

Endemic flora of Fiji
euthytricha
Taxonomy articles created by Polbot